is a Shingon temple in the northeast of Nara, Japan. A number of its buildings and images have been designated National Treasures and Important Cultural Properties, and its late-Heian period gardens are a Place of Scenic Beauty.

History
Enjō-ji is said to have been founded in 756 by a Chinese priest who accompanied Ganjin to Japan. The temple was enlarged in the late-Heian and Muromachi periods. Much damage occurred during the Ōnin War, and further losses occurred during the Meiji period and after.

Buildings
The two-storey gate of 1468 and Hondō of 1472 are both Important Cultural Properties. The tahōtō is lost and has been replaced with a modern replica.

Also on the grounds are a number of Shinto shrines. The single bay Kasugadō and Hakusandō of 1227/8 are the oldest extant examples of kasuga-zukuri and are thought to have been moved from Kasuga-taisha when it was rebuilt. In 1953, both buildings were designated National Treasures. The Honden of the shrine to Ugajin dating to the end of the Kamakura period is an Important Cultural Property.

Treasures

Of Japanese cypress using the yoseki-zukuri technique, it is gilded over lacquer and has crystal eyes. In 1920, it was designated a National Treasure. Other images include a Jūichimen Kannon of 1026, a child prince of 1309 that has been designated a Prefectural Cultural Property, a Fudō Myōō of the Nanboku-chō period, and a gilded Yakushi Nyorai. The gorintō of 1321 has also been designated an Important Cultural Property.

Gardens
The temple gardens are a rare example of late-Heian Pure Land paradise gardens and in 1973 were designated a Place of Scenic Beauty.

See also
List of National Treasures of Japan (shrines)
List of National Treasures of Japan (sculptures)
Thirteen Buddhist Sites of Yamato
Japanese gardens
Place of Scenic Beauty
Honji suijaku

References

External links
 Enjōji

Buddhist temples in Nara, Nara
Places of Scenic Beauty
Shinto shrines in Nara Prefecture
National Treasures of Japan
Gardens in Nara Prefecture